Jerry Miller is an American musician.

Jerry Miller may also refer to:

Jerry Miller (racing driver)
Jerry H. Miller, professor
Jerry T. Miller, American politician in the Kentucky House of Representatives

See also
Gerry Miller (disambiguation)
Jerome Miller (disambiguation)
Jeremy Miller, American actor
Jeremy Miller (politician)
Gerald Miller (disambiguation)